An act is a major division of a theatre work, including a play, film, opera, or musical theatre, consisting of one or more scenes. The term can either refer to a conscious division placed within a work by a playwright (usually itself made up of multiple scenes) or a unit of analysis for dividing a dramatic work into sequences. As applied, those definitions may or may not align. The word act can also be used for major sections of other entertainment, such as variety shows, television programs, music hall performances, cabaret, and literature.

Acts and scenes 
An act is a part of a play defined by elements such as rising action, climax, and resolution. A scene normally represents actions happening in one place at one time, and is marked off from the next scene by a curtain, a black-out, or a brief emptying of the stage.

To be more specific, the elements that create the plot of a play and divide it into acts include the exposition, which gives information, setting up the rest of the story. Another element is the inciting incident, which starts all the action that will follow. Going along with the inciting incident, the major dramatic question is formed, which holds the rest of the play. The majority of the play is made up of complications, which change the action. These complications lead to the crisis, which is the final plot point. At this point, the major dramatic question has usually been answered. Finally, there is "the resolution, also known as the denouement", which is the end of the play, where everything comes together and the situation has been resolved, leaving the audience satisfied with the play as a whole. These more specific elements of plot are the main things used to divide a play into acts and sometimes scenes, Sometimes the play may not end as a resolved situation, it may leave the audience on a peak and have a sequel to it.

Though there is no limit to the number of acts in a dramatic work, some may have been derived from different interpretations of Aristotle's Poetics, in which he stresses the primacy of plot over character and "an orderly arrangement of parts" and others may have been derived from Freytag's Pyramid.

History 
Roman theatre was the first to divide plays into a number of acts separated by intervals. Acts may be further divided into scenes. In classical theater, each regrouping between entrances and exits of actors is a scene, while later use describes a change of setting.

Modern plays often have only one level of structure, which can be referred to as either scenes or acts at the whim of the writer, and some writers dispense with firm divisions entirely. Successive scenes are normally separated from each other in either time or place, but the division between acts is more to do with the overall dramatic structure of the piece. The end of an act often coincides with one or more characters making an important decision or having an important decision to make, a decision which has a profound impact on the story being told.

Contemporary theatre, in line with screenwriting and novel forms, tends towards a three-act structure. Many operettas and most musicals are divided into just two acts, so, in practice, the intermission is seen as dividing them, and the word "act" comes to be used for the two-halves of a show whether or not the script divides it into acts.

Varieties

One-act plays 

A one-act play is a short drama that consists of only one act; the phrase is not used to describe a full-length play that does not utilize act-divisions. Unlike other plays which usually are published one play per book, one-act plays are often published in anthologies or collections.

Three-act plays 

In a three-act play, each act usually has a different mood. In the most commonly used structure, the first act has a lot of introductory elements (that is, who, what, when, where, why, and how); the second act is usually the darkest, with the antagonists having a greater compass; and the third act has a resolution (dénouement), often with the protagonists prevailing.
 Act one: The conflict of the story is discovered. The exposition, the introduction of the protagonist and other characters that the protagonist meets, take place, as well as the dramatic premise and inciting incident (the incident that sets the events of the story in motion) occurs approximately halfway through the first act.
 Act two: The main character encounters an obstacle that prevents the character from achieving his or her dramatic need. This is known as the complication. The main character reaches his or her lowest point, seems farthest from fulfilling the dramatic need or objective, and seems to have no way to succeed.
 Act three: The climax occurs as well as the resolution (dénouement), a brief period of calm at the end of a play where a state of equilibrium returns.

Five-act plays 
Until the 18th century, most plays were divided into five acts. The work of William Shakespeare, for example, generally adheres to a five-act structure. This format is known as the five-act play, and was famously analyzed by Gustav Freytag in Die Technik des Dramas (Dramatic techniques). The five acts played specific functions in the overall structure of the play, but in performance, there was not necessarily any clear separation between them.

A similar five-part structure is also used in traditional Japanese Noh drama, particularly by Zeami Motokiyo. Zeami, in his work "Sandō" (The Three Paths), originally described a five-part (five dan) Noh play as the ideal form. It begins slowly and auspiciously in the first part (jo), building up the drama and tension in the second, third, and fourth parts (ha), with the greatest climax in the third dan, and rapidly concluding with a return to peace and auspiciousness in the fifth dan (kyū).

Other media 
As part of a television program, each individual act can be separated by commercials.

In film, a number of scenes grouped together bring an audiovisual work to life. The three-act structure is commonly referred to in film adaptations of theatrical plays.

See also 
 Acting

Notes

References 
 
 

Drama
Narrative units